Munin may refer to:

Munin (satellite)
Munin (software)
Munin (video game)
Muninn, one of the ravens "Huginn and Muninn" in Norse mythology
Hugin and Munin (Marvel Comics), fictional characters based on the above
Munin, a half-scale Gokstad ship replica in Vancouver, B.C., Canada
, several ships of the Swedish Navy

People
Munin Barua (1946–2018), Indian film director
Munin Barkotoki (1915-1993), Indian writer
Munin Saiprasart (born 1988), Thai cartoonist
Iliya Munin (born 1993), Bulgarian footballer
Nellie Munin (born 1962), Israeli lawyer